P. Govindan Nambiar (15 December 1915 - 1969) was an Indian politician and leader of Communist Party of India. He represented Perinthalmanna constituency in 1st KLA.

He was also the President of Perinthalmanna Grama Panchayat. He entered politics in 1932 and joined the CPI in 1942. He has been imprisoned several times.His great grandchild
 is Niranjan Karuthedath.

References

Communist Party of India politicians from Kerala
1915 births
1969 deaths
Kerala MLAs 1957–1959